Robert Glasby Kenny (24 February 1876 – 4 May 1940) was an  Australian rules footballer who played with St Kilda in the Victorian Football League (VFL).

He later served in the Navy in World War I.

References

External links 

1876 births
1940 deaths
VFL/AFL players born outside Australia
Australian rules footballers from Victoria (Australia)
St Kilda Football Club players